Eddie Pellagrini Diamond is a baseball stadium at the Harrington Athletics Village located in Boston College in Boston, Massachusetts, United States.

History 
Boston College constructed the new Eddie Pellagrini Diamond as part of an effort to improve the facilities of its athletic programs. The Board of Trustees deemed the previous Shea Field to be inadequate for the Atlantic Coast Conference standards and immediately launched plans for a new facility. The field was built on land which belonged to St. John's Seminary before being purchased by Boston College between 2004 and 2007.

The Brighton Baseball Field was slated to open on March 13, 2018, in Boston College's home opener against Holy Cross but was canceled due to a nor'easter. The stadium opened a week later on March 20, when the Eagles hosted cross-town opponents Northeastern in a non-conference matchup that Northeastern won 7–4 in 18 innings.

The complex that encompasses Eddie Pellagrini Diamond is dedicated to John L. Harrington, Boston College Trustee and former CEO of the Boston Red Sox.

Facilities 
Eddie Pellagrini Diamond utilizes AstroTurf Diamond Series for an artificial turf playing surface. The stadium has 1,000 fixed seat-back chairs but capacity can be expanded to 2,500 for championship events. The stadium has lights sufficient for night games.

See also 
 Boston College Eagles baseball
 Harrington Athletics Village
 List of NCAA Division I baseball venues
 List of U.S. baseball stadiums by capacity

References

External links 
 Harrington Athletics Village on Boston College Athletics website

2018 establishments in Massachusetts
Boston College Eagles baseball venues
Baseball venues in Boston
College baseball venues in the United States
Sports venues completed in 2018